Richard Alexander Hewat (3 May 1896 – 14 August 1918) was an American pursuit pilot who flew with the Royal Flying Corps (RFC) in World War I. He joined the RFC in 1917 and was killed in action near Bailleul in France on 14 August 1918. He was a flying ace, having shot down six aircraft during the war.

Biography
Born in Lawrence, Massachusetts, he was the son of R. A. J. and Jessie Bell Hewat. Richard Alexander Hewat's father was co-founder of Strong, Hewat and Company. "Alex" Hewat was one of five brothers from Briggsville, Massachusetts who fought in the Great War. He was a "crack end" on Tad Jones' undefeated football team at Exeter Academy in 1915.

He joined the Royal Flying Corps in June 1917 and was posted to 19 Squadron in September. Scoring his third victory on 26 October 1917, his SPAD VII was hit by ground fire and Hewat received a head wound. When he recovered, he was reassigned to 87 Squadron and returned to France in April 1918. Flying the Sopwith Dolphin, Hewat scored three more victories before he was killed in action, probably shot down by Hermann Leptien.

See also

 List of World War I flying aces from the United States

References

1896 births
1918 deaths
American World War I flying aces
British military personnel killed in World War I